Programmed Inquiry, Learning, or Teaching (PILOT) is a simple high-level programming language developed in the 1960s.
Like its younger sibling LOGO, it was an early foray into the technology of computer-assisted instruction.

PILOT is an imperative language similar in structure to BASIC and FORTRAN in its basic layout and structure. Its keywords are single characters, T for "type" to print text, or A for "accept", to input values from the user.

Its History 

PILOT was developed by John Amsden Starkweather, a psychology professor at the University of California, San Francisco medical center. In 1962, he developed a simple language for automating learning tests called Computest. Starting in 1968, he developed a follow-on project called PILOT, for various computers of the time such as the SDS 940.

Language syntax

A line of PILOT code contains (from left to right) the following syntax elements:

 an optional label
 a command letter
 an optional Y (for yes) or N (for no)
 an optional conditional expression in parentheses
 a colon (":")
 an operand, or multiple operands delimited by commas.

A label can also be alone in a line, not followed by other code.  The syntax for a label is an asterisk followed by an identifier (alphanumeric string with alphabetic initial character).

Command letters

The following commands are used in "core PILOT".  Lines beginning with "R:" indicate a remark (or a comment) explaining the code that follows.

 A Accept input into "accept buffer". Examples:

  R:Next line of input replaces current contents of accept buffer
  A:
  R:Next line of input replaces accept buffer, and string variable 'FREE'
  A:$FREE
  R:Next 3 lines of input assigned to string variables 'X', 'Y' and 'Z'
  A:$X,$Y,$Z
  R:Numeric input assigned to numeric variable "Q"
  A:#Q

 C Compute and assign numeric value. Most PILOT implementations have only integer arithmetic, and no arrays.  Example:

  R:Assign arithmetic mean of #X and #Y to #AM
  C:#AM=(#X+#Y)/2

 D Dimension an array, on some implementations.

 E End (return from) subroutine or (if outside of a subroutine) abort program.  Always used without any operand.

 J Jump to a label. Example:
  J:*RESTART

 M Match the accept buffer against string variables or string literals. Example:
  R:Search accept buffer for "TRUTH", the value of MEXICO and "YOUTH", in that order
  M:TRUTH,$MEXICO,YOUTH

The first match string (if any) that is a substring of the accept buffer is assigned to the special variable $MATCH.  The buffer characters left of the first match are assigned to $LEFT, and the characters on the right are assigned to $RIGHT.

The match flag is set to 'yes' or 'no', depending on whether a match is made.  Any statement that has a Y following the command letter is processed only if the match flag is set.  Statements with N are processed only if the flag is not set.

 N Equivalent to TN:  (type if last match unsuccessful)

 R The operand of R: is a comment, and therefore has no effect.

 T 'Type' operand as output. Examples:
  R:The next line prints a literal string
  T:Thank you for your support.
  R:The next line combines a literal string with a variable expression
  T:Thank you, $NAME.

 U Use (call) a subroutine.  A subroutine starts with a label and ends with E: Example:
  R:Call subroutine starting at label *INITIALIZE
  U:*INITIALIZE

 Y Equivalent to TY: (type if last match successful)

 Parentheses If there is a parenthesized expression in a statement, it is a conditional expression, and the statement is processed only if the test has a value of 'true'. Example:
  R:Type message if x>y+z
  T(#X>#Y+#Z):Condition met

Derivatives
Extensions to core PILOT include arrays and floating point numbers in Apple PILOT, and implementation of LOGO-inspired turtle graphics in Atari PILOT.

Between 1979 and 1983 the UK PILOT User Group was run by Alec Wood a teacher at Wirral Grammar School for Boys, Merseyside UK.  Several machine code versions of a mini PILOT were produced for the microcomputers of the time and a school in Scotland developed an interactive foreign language tutorial where pupils guided footprints around a town asking and answering questions in German, French, etc. An article in the December 1979 of Computer Age covered an early implementation called Tiny Pilot and gave a complete machine code listing.

Versions of PILOT overlaid on the BASIC interpreters of early microcomputers were not unknown in the late 1970s and early 1980s, and Byte Magazine at one point published a non-Turing complete derivative of PILOT known as Waduzitdo by Larry Kheriarty as a way of demonstrating what a computer was capable of.  PETPILOT (PILOT for the Commodore PET) was the first non-Commodore language for the PET and was written in Microsoft BASIC which shipped with the PET, with a little assistance from Bill Gates.  It was created in 1979 by Dave Gomberg and could run on a 4K PET (which was never shipped) and ran well on the 8K PETs that Commodore shipped.  It was written in Larry Tessler's living room on PET serial number 2.

1983's Vanilla PILOT for the Commodore 64 added turtle graphics, as did Super Turtle PILOT which was published as a type-in listing in the October 1987 issue of COMPUTE! magazine.

In 1991 the Institute of Electrical and Electronics Engineers (IEEE) published a standard for Pilot as IEEE Std 1154-1991. It has since been withdrawn. A reference implementation based on this was implemented by Eric Raymond, and maintained—-reluctantly—-for the next 15 years.

In 1990 eSTeem PILOT for Atari ST computers was developed and programmed by Tom Nielsen, EdD. Based on the IEEE Standards for PILOT, it includes Atari-specific features such as control of Laserdisc and CDROM devices.

A 2018 hobbyist implementation, psPILOT, based in part on the IEEE standard, was implemented using Microsoft's PowerShell scripting language.

References

Further reading
 

Educational programming languages
IEEE standards